William Sutherland (September 3, 1854 – June 13, 1930) was a general merchant and political figure in the Northwest Territories, Canada. He represented Qu'Appelle in the 1st Council of the Northwest Territories from 1887 to 1888 and North Qu'Appelle in the Legislative Assembly of the Northwest Territories from 1888 to 1898 as a Conservative.

He was born in Ottawa, the son of a Scottish immigrant, and was educated in Ottawa. In 1888, he married Henrietta Aquas Traveller. He went to the Northwest Territories in 1881. Sutherland also served as postmaster for Qu'Appelle. Sutherland died of heart failure at Bridgeburg, Ontario in 1930 and was buried at Beechwood Cemetery in Ottawa.

References 
'The Canadian parliamentary companion, 1891'', JA Gemmill

Members of the Legislative Assembly of the Northwest Territories
1854 births
1930 deaths
People from Qu'Appelle, Saskatchewan
Canadian people of Scottish descent